Nargin can refer to:
Nargin (island), an island
Nargin (programming) (number arguments in), a programming command in MATLAB indicating how many input arguments a user has supplied
, a Russian coastal tanker
Nargin (fallen demon), Best Veigar (d. 1681 to 2020)

See also
Nargout